The St-Just Cyclone, also called the St-Just Cyclone 180, is a Canadian homebuilt aircraft that was designed and produced by St-Just Aviation of Mirabel, Quebec. The company has since moved to Boucherville, Quebec. While it was available the aircraft was supplied as a kit and in the form of plans for amateur construction.

The Cyclone was later developed into the higher gross weight St-Just Super-Cyclone, which superseded it in production.

Design and development
The Cyclone is a replica of the Cessna 180 that incorporates modifications and improvements, such as an extended wing span, greater wing area and vertically hinged doors. It features a strut-braced high-wing, a four-seat enclosed cabin accessed via doors, fixed conventional landing gear and a single engine in tractor configuration.

The aircraft is made from sheet aluminum, with the kit airframe parts preformed with pilot holes to allow construction without the use of jigs.

The manufacturer estimated the construction time from the supplied kit as 2000 hours.

Operational history
In December 2013, 23 examples were registered in Canada with Transport Canada and three in the United States with the Federal Aviation Administration.

Specifications (Cyclone)

References

Cyclone
1990s Canadian civil utility aircraft
Single-engined tractor aircraft
High-wing aircraft
Homebuilt aircraft
Aircraft first flown in 1992